Paratebueno is a municipality and town of Colombia in the department of Cundinamarca.

Climate
Paratebueno has a tropical monsoon climate (Köppen Am) with heavy to very heavy rainfall in all months except January.

References

External links
 Paratebueno official website

Municipalities of Cundinamarca Department